Omar Ahmed  (born 3 August 1970) is an Iraqi former football goalkeeper who played for Iraq at the 1989 FIFA World Youth Championship.

Omar played for the national team in 1993.

References

Iraqi footballers
Iraq international footballers
Living people
Association football goalkeepers
1970 births